Sheikh Jassim bin Mohammed Al Thani (c. 1825 – 17 July 1913), also known as "The Founder", was the founder of the State of Qatar. He had a total of 56 children, 19 sons and 37 daughters.

Early life and governance
Although the exact date of his birth is unknown,  Jassim bin Mohammed Al Thani was born around 1825. Raised in Fuwayrit, Qatar, Jassim claimed to be descended from the Tamim tribe, as he was the eldest son of Mohammed bin Thani. Al Thani acquired full capability in the management of the country's affairs during his youth and guided its policies and steered the country during a period that witnessed major events and changes. Jassim, as a result of engaging in politics while serving as deputy to his father, acquired political experience. He later moved to Al Bidda with his father when he was around twenty-one years old, where he emerged among his mates as a young leader, which he later illustrated as he fended off Qatar's invaders such as the Emirate of Nejd

At the local level, Al Thani sought to turn Qatar into a single unified and independent entity. Under his leadership, Qatar emerged as a coherent and stable country whose tribes he assembled to usher its future and thus consolidating its existence and borders. He adopted policies dealing with the two major powers competing to dominate the Persian Gulf and its territories, namely the British Empire, which had started to extend its influence through the Government of India, and the Ottoman Empire, which was seeking to retain its control of the region following the demise of the Portuguese influence in the 16th century.

Imprisonment

Jassim bin Mohammed Al Thani was imprisoned by the ruler of Bahrain, Mohamed bin Khalifa, in 1867 when Jassim travelled to Bahrain to discuss the capture of an alleged trespassing Qatari bedouin. His demand for the bedouin's return provoked Bahrain, which was backed by Abu Dhabi, to launch attacks on major Qatari cities, causing significant damage. In retaliation, Qatar attacked Bahrain in 1868, resulting in the deaths of a thousand men and the sinking of sixty ships. Jassim was later released in return for captured Bahrainis.

Conflicts with the Ottoman Empire
In April 1871, the expedition sent by Midhat Pasha, the Ottoman governor of Baghdad, to Eastern Arabia arrived. In an attempt to secure a landing for Ottoman troops, the Ottomans sent an envoy bearing an Ottoman flag to Sheikh Jassim. He accepted and flew the flag, and by December of that year had authorized the Ottomans to send military equipment and 100 troops to Al Bidda. In January 1872, Qatar was formally incorporated into the Ottoman Empire as a province in Najd with Sheikh Jassim being appointed its kaymakam (sub-governor).

18 December 1878 was the turning point when Sheikh Jassim took power. It was also the inception of the modern State of Qatar, achieved as a result of Sheikh Jassim's assiduous efforts that led to gaining full recognition by both powers of Qatar's independence.

Despite the disapproval of local tribes, Al Thani continued supporting Ottoman rule. However, Qatari-Ottoman relations soon stagnated, and in 1882 they suffered further setbacks when the Ottomans refused to aid Al Thani in his expedition of Abu Dhabi-occupied Al Khor. Al Thani fell out of favor with the Ottomans after they received complaints from Qataris regarding his oppressions from 1885 to 1886. In a further blow to bilateral relations, the Ottomans supported the Ottoman subject Mohammed bin Abdul Wahab who attempted to supplant Al Thani as kaymakam of Qatar in 1888.

Sheikh Jassim soon became a leading figure in the opposition against the Ottoman Empire's attempts to increase its influence in Qatar through its appointing of administrative personnel in Zubarah, Doha, Al Wakrah and Khawr al Udayd, establishing a customs office and reinforcing the Ottoman garrison. In early 1892, he resigned as kaymakam of Qatar and stopped paying taxes to the Ottoman Empire in August of that year.

Opposition against the British Empire
Aside from being opposed against the Ottoman Empire, Sheikh Jassim was also opposed against the attempts at imperialism by the British Empire. In 1882, in addition to closing their shops, he expelled British Indian pearl traders from Doha. He renounced his jurisdiction of Doha the same year, and members of the Bani Hajir tribe attacked the pearl traders shortly after, resulting in the merchants' withdrawal from the country and the forfeiture of their profits during that period.

Battle of Al Wajbah

In October 1892, an Ottoman army comprising approximately 200 men led by the governor of Basra, Mehmed Hafiz Pasha, was sent to Qatar in response to Sheikh Jassim's transgressions. They arrived in February 1893, with further reinforcements en route from Kuwait. Sheikh Jassim, fearing that he would face death or imprisonment, fled first to Al Daayen, and then to Al Wajbah Fort (10 miles west of Doha) where he was accompanied by several Qatari tribes.

Mehmed sent a letter to Sheikh Jassim demanding that he disband his troops and pledge loyalty to the Ottomans. However, Sheikh Jassim remained adamant in his refusal to comply with Ottoman authority, and, additionally, refused to meet with Mehmed himself on the basis of ill health. Instead, he appointed his brother, Ahmed bin Mohammed Al Thani, as his emissary. In March, after a month of back-and-forth parleying, Mehmed lost patience and imprisoned Sheikh Jassim's brother and between 13 and 16 prominent Qatari tribal leaders on the Ottoman corvette Merrikh.

As a result, a military confrontation followed in March 1893 and a crucial battle broke out between the Qataris, led by Sheikh Jassim and the Ottoman soldiers. He and his troops, who were composed of several Qatari tribes, fought a major battle in which they inflicted defeat on the Ottoman troops and achieved victory. The victory was decisive, leaving the Turks no choice but to free the Qatari captives in exchange of Sheikh Jassim permitting the captured Turkish cavalry free passage by land to Hofuf, Saudi Arabia.

The battle was a turning point in Qatar's history, making it one of the most important and major battles of Qatar's strive for independence and freedom against oppression. The fort that Sheikh Jassim used to fend off the Ottoman soldiers in the main battle of Al Wajbah was the Al Wajbah Fort, found in the municipality of Al Rayyan.

Abdication and later reign
The British attempted to intervene in the dispute between the Turkish soldiers and the Qatari tribes but found themselves unable to take up Jassim's offer to place Qatar under British protection. The Turks made their peace with Sheikh Jassim though he moved to live peacefully at Lusail, leaving the running of the country to his brother, Sheikh Ahmed bin Muhammed Al Thani. Since as early as May 1884, Shaikh Jassim had been writing to the British government that he had "resigned the government of El-bida, to which his brother Ahmed took charge of (Qatar's Capital presently known as Doha).

Sheikh Ahmed was noted as a clever man with a remarkable personality by the Political Agent in Bahrain at the time, who met the Sheikh in November 1905  at his house in Al-Bida, describing him as “extraordinary”, in his letter to the Political Resident in the Persian Gulf . Prior to meeting the Sheikh, the Political Agent met with his older brother Sheikh Jassim in Lusail where he had been residing, for more than five years. Sheikh Jassim was in his eighties at the time and suffering from severe ophthalmia while being accompanied by his son-in-law Nasir bin Mubarak Al-Khalifa, this took the Political Agent by surprise as he was hoping to meet the two brothers Sheikh Jassim and Sheikh Ahmad. The Agent described the latter incident in his letter by stating “I was disappointed at not seeing Sheikh Ahmed in Sheikh Jasim’s camp as he was aware that I had expressed a wish to meet him there. It seems, however, that a certain amount of latent jealousy exists between the two brothers and the presence of Nasir bin Mubarak whom he does not like also probably contributed to keep the younger brother away.”

The Political Agent wrote about his visit that took place in Sheikh Ahmad's house a few days after visiting Sheikh Jassim, describing it as a hospitable visit by stating “Sheikh Ahmed received me in a most friendly style, and put me up in his guest-room, making my clerical staff and sepoys most comfortable elsewhere,” He also described the Sheikh as one who possesses a partisan spirit who was popular and influential amongst his subjects . The forty five year old Sheikh at the time also appeared to possess a lighthearted personality which is evident through the statement  “Whenever a point was hard pressed against him, he would break into most infectious roars of laughter, though the causes were hard to find, and to such an extent almost to make one question his sanity. There is no doubt however that the people of Bahrein and Katar regard him as being a strong and clever man.”

He was killed by his servant at Doha in December 1905. His murderer's name was Bin Mu'ammam and even though it was rumored that the murderer and his two accomplices were executed by Sheikh Jassim, this was found to be incorrect. In fact, it was claimed by the British political agent residing in Bahrain at the time that overlooked, reported on and frequently visited Qatar that a strong minority of people in Qatar believed that Sheikh Khalifa, the eldest son of Sheikh Jassim bin Mohammed was an abetter in the murder of Sheikh Jasim's younger brother Sheikh Ahmad bin Mohammed bin Thani (this was the reason for Khalifa declining the throne, which resulted ultimately in the fact that none of his direct descendants ever ascended the throne). After Sheikh Ahmad's death, his eldest son Sheikh Ali was considered to be appointed to take up his father's many responsibilities, but deemed too young by Sheikh Jassim.

Death
He died on the afternoon of 17 July 1913 and was buried in Lusail, a village located 24 km north of Doha, which is found in the municipality of Al Daayen.

Children
He had a total of 19 sons. For more information about his sons, see the table below.

Notes

References

Further reading
Al Thani Tree
Official Biography
Qatar National Day: Our History
Catnaps – Background of Qatar in the Gulf

1825 births
1913 deaths
Jassim bin Mohammed Al Thani
Jassim bin Mohammed Al Thani
19th-century Arabs